John Tolkin (born July 31, 2002) is an American professional soccer player who plays as a left-back for Major League Soccer club New York Red Bulls and the United States national team.

Club career

Youth and Early Career
Raised in Chatham Borough, New Jersey, where he attended Chatham High School. Tolkin joined the New York Red Bulls Academy in 2015. During the 2019 USL Championship season he appeared for New York Red Bulls II. He made his professional debut on July 10, 2019, coming on as a second half substitute in a 4-3 victory over Bethlehem Steel. During the match he recorded his first professional assist on  Tom Barlow's equalizer in the 82nd minute.

New York Red Bulls
After appearing for New York Red Bulls II in 2019, Tolkin moved up to the club's MLS roster on January 14, 2020. Tolkin made his MLS debut on May 8, 2021 appearing as a substitute against Toronto FC in a 2–0 victory. On May 29, 2021, Tolkin made his first start for the club in a 2–1 victory over Orlando City SC, earning praise for his play during the match. Tolkin scored his first professional goal on August 18, 2021 in a 1–0 win against the Columbus Crew.

On May 10, 2022, Tolkin scored his first goal of the season for New York in a 3-0 victory over DC United, helping the club advance to Round of 16 in the 2022 U.S. Open Cup. On August 18, 2022, Tolkin helped New York to a 2-1 victory over Atlanta United scoring the deciding goal. On October 5, 2022, Tolkin signed a new contract with New York tying him to the club until 2027, with an option for 2028  On November 18, 2022, Tolkin was named New York Red Bulls Defender of the Year for the 2022 season.

Career statistics

Club

International

References

External links 
 
 ussoccerda.com profile

2002 births
Living people
American soccer players
Homegrown Players (MLS)
New York Red Bulls II players
New York Red Bulls players
Association football defenders
Chatham High School (New Jersey) alumni
People from Chatham Borough, New Jersey
Soccer players from New Jersey
Sportspeople from Morris County, New Jersey
USL Championship players
United States men's youth international soccer players
Major League Soccer players
United States men's international soccer players